Desire (aka The Magic Skin) is a 1920 British silent fantasy film directed by George Edwardes-Hall, produced by Edward Godal, and starring Dennis Neilson-Terry, Yvonne Arnaud and Christine Maitland. The film was known in England as The Magic Skin. The screenplay was based on the 1831 Honoré de Balzac novel Le Peau de Chagrin, which strangely was adapted to film three different times in 1920 alone, the other two being released as The Dream Cheater and Narayama.

Born in 1872, director Hall relocated from his birthplace Brooklyn, New York to England later in life, then moved to California, where he died in 1922. He actually did more screenwriting than directing during his career, and also wrote a number of plays and short stories.

Plot
A man named Valentin obtains a magic shagreen, a leather hide made from the skin of a wild jackass. The shagreen is said to grant its owner's every wish, but at the price of his immortal soul.

Cast
 Dennis Neilson-Terry as Raphael Valentin  
 Yvonne Arnaud as Pauline  
 Christine Maitland as Fedora  
 George W. Anson as Duval  
 Chris Walker as Jonathan  
 Pardoe Woodman as Emile  
 Austin Leigh as Andre Valentin  
 Saba Raleigh as Mother

References

Bibliography
 Low, Rachael. History of the British Film, 1918-1929. George Allen & Unwin, 1971.

External links
 

1920 films
1920s fantasy films
British fantasy films
British silent feature films
Films based on works by Honoré de Balzac
British black-and-white films
1920s English-language films
1920s British films